The 2015–16 season is Hyderabad cricket team's 82nd competitive season. The Hyderabad cricket team and Hyderabad women's cricket team are senior men's and women's domestic cricket teams based in the city of Hyderabad, India, run by the Hyderabad Cricket Association. They represent the state of Telangana in domestic competitions.

Competition Overview

Senior Men's team

Squads
 Head coach: Abdul Azeem
 Assistant coach : T Dilip
 Fielding Coach : NS Ganesh
 Physio : Prasanth Panchada
 Trainer : Subash Chandra Patro
 Video analyst : E Vinay Kumar

 
Sudeep Tyagi moved from the Saurashtra to the Hyderabad ahead of the 2015–16 season.

Indian Premier League
Local franchise, Sunrisers Hyderabad retained Ashish Reddy and picked Tirumalasetti Suman while Delhi Daredevils picked Chama Milind in the IPL Auction for 2016 Indian Premier League season.

Ranji Trophy

Hyderabad began their campaign in Ranji Trophy, the premier first-class cricket tournament in India, against Goa at Porvorim on 1 October 2015. They finished eighth in Group C with no wins, six draws and two losses.

Points table
 Group C

Matches
Group Stage

Statistics
Most runs

 Source: Cricinfo
Most wickets

 Source: Cricinfo

Vijay Hazare Trophy

Hyderabad began their campaign in Vijay Hazare Trophy, a List A cricket tournament in India, against Punjab at Hyderabad on 11 December 2015. They finished in sixth in Group A with a win and five losses.

Points Table
Group A

Matches
Group Stage

Statistics
Most runs

 Source: Cricinfo
Most wickets

 Source: Cricinfo

Syed Mushtaq Ali Trophy

Hyderabad began their campaign in Syed Mushtaq Ali Trophy, a Twenty20 tournament in India, against Bengal at Nagpur on 2 January 2016. They finished in fifth in Group A with two wins and four losses.

Points Table
Group A

Matches
Group Stage

Statistics
Most runs

 Source: Cricinfo
Most wickets

 Source: Cricinfo

Senior Women's team

Squads
 Head coach: Purnima Rao 
 Assistant coach: Nooshin Al Khadeer
 Assistant coach: Savita Nirala 
 Physio : Harsha Jain
 Trainer : Swathi

Senior women's cricket inter zonal three day game
Arundhati Reddy, Gouher Sultana and Vellore Mahesh Kavya got selected for South Zone squad for 2015-16 Senior women's cricket inter zonal three day game, a Women's First-class cricket tournament in India. This was the first edition to be scheduled with three-day games as the previous edition had two-day games.

One-Day League
Hyderabad began their campaign in Senior women's one day league, Women's List A cricket tournament in India, against Bengal at Panaji on 15 November 2015. They finished inside top-2 in Elite Group B with three wins and a loss to advance to Super League. They finished fourth in Super League with a win and two losses.

Points Table

Elite Group B

 Top two teams advanced to Super League. 
 Bottom team relegated to 2016-17 Plate Group.

Elite Super League

 Champions. 
 Runners-up.

Matches
Group Stage

Super League Stage

Statistics
Most runs

 Source: BCCI
Most wickets

 Source: BCCI

T20 League
Hyderabad began their campaign in Senior Women's T20 League, a Women's Twenty20 cricket tournament in India, against Delhi at Kolkata on 2 January 2016. They finished in fourth in Elite Group B with two wins and two losses.

Points Table
Elite Group B

 Top two teams advanced to Super League. 
 Bottom team relegated to 2016-17 Plate Group.

Matches
Group Stage

Statistics
Most runs

 Source: BCCI
Most wickets

 Source: BCCI

See also
Hyderabad cricket team 
Hyderabad women's cricket team 
Hyderabad Cricket Association

References

External links
Hyderabad cricket team official site

Cricket in Hyderabad, India
Cricket in Telangana
Sport in Telangana